is a Japanese pharmaceutical company based in Tokyo.

History
Taisho was established in 1912 as Taisho Seiyakusho to produce over-the-counter drugs. In 1928 the company changed its name to Taisho Pharmaceutical Co., Ltd. and in 1955 moved into prescription drug R&D. It introduced its over-the-counter medications like cough suppressant in 1927, pain reliever in 1967 and an antiulcer agent in 1984. In 2019 Taisho bought French pharmaceutical manufacturer UPSA from Bristol-Myers Squibb.

Products
The company's principal line of business is over-the-counter (OTC) medicines, where it markets the brands Lipovitan-D, Pabron, Colac, Contac, Tempra, UPSA, Vicks and Kampo
In prescription pharmaceuticals, the company's most successful product to date has been the macrolide antibiotic clarithromycin. The company's branded version of the drug, Clarith, was launched in Japan in 1991. For clarithromycin distribution outside Japan Taisho licensed clarithromycin to Abbott Laboratories.

Ownership
Taisho Pharmaceutical's stock is traded on the Tokyo Stock Exchange and the principal owners of the firm are the Uehara family name.

Sponsorships
Taisho has sponsored the Japan national rugby union team since 2001. The company was also an Official Sponsor of the Rugby World Cup 2019, which took place in Japan.

References

External links

 

Pharmaceutical companies of Japan
Pharmaceutical companies based in Tokyo
Companies listed on the Tokyo Stock Exchange
Pharmaceutical companies established in 1912
Japanese companies established in 1912
Japanese brands